The Scottish Golf Show is a Scottish television series aired on Scottish TV and Grampian TV (now both together as STV).

The Scottish Golf Show was narrated by Iain Anderson and produced, directed & edited by Scott Brown. The series was first broadcast in 2005, and was re-aired in 2006, and again in May 2009 on STV.

Episode guide/synopsis

Episode 1

The first episode overviews Scotland's golf courses, beginning with arguably the most famous of them all — St Andrews. The exclusive Royal and Ancient Golf Club of St Andrews opens its doors and the origins of the game are explored at the British Golf Museum.

Episode 2

This edition features one of Scotland's premier venues - the championship course at Royal Troon, and looks at some of the other major courses in Ayrshire.

Episode 3

This edition features the Open Championship venue at Carnoustie and some of the hidden gems along the east coast.

Episode 4

The show visits Royal Dornoch. Graeme Baxter talks about the art of golf, and we take a look behind the scenes at Elmwood College in Fife, where students from all over the world come to learn the art of gamekeeping.

Episode 5

In this edition, The Scottish Golf Show opens with some action at  Gleneagles in Perthshire.

Episode 6

This edition opens at Turnberry in Ayrshire, where Colin Montgomerie shows us around his Links Golf Academy.

Episode 7

Episode number 7 shows the oldest golf club in the world, Muirfield - home of the Honourable Company of Edinburgh Golfers.

External links 

2000s Scottish television series
2005 Scottish television series debuts
Golf on television
Television series by STV Studios